Yanto Alexander Critchlow-Barker (born 6 January 1980) is a British former professional racing cyclist from Wales, who was the highest placed Briton in the 2005 Tour of Britain, coming ninth in the general classification.

Career
Born in Carmarthen and despite starting racing late at the age of 15, joining the Mid-Devon Cycling Club, Barker was successful in the junior ranks (aged 16–18). Having won the Junior British National Road Race Championships, he was selected to ride the Junior Road Race World Championships where he finished 11th.

When Barker joined the senior ranks at the age of 19, he was selected to represent Britain as part of the National U23 team, and was paid. He moved to Manchester to be closer to the track and the medical & coaching team. He competed in the Under-23 road races at the UCI Road World Championships in 1999, 2001 and 2002, taking his best finish in 2002 when he crossed the line in 12th place.

By 2000, there was less money available for cyclists such as Barker and, following the advice of a coach, he moved to France at the age of 20 to gain experience of continental racing. He represented Wales at the 2006 Commonwealth Games in Melbourne

He initially retired from professional cycling in 2007, returning to live in Devon but returned to cycling in 2010 to ride for the Pendragon Sports / Le Col / Colnago Team.

In 2013, Barker won the inaugural edition of the  UCS Ipswich and Coastal GP when sprinting clear on an eight-man group containing Mike Northey and Rob Partridge.

After one season with Raleigh Barker was announced as the leader of the new ONE Pro Cycling team for the 2015 season. In September 2016 Barker announced that he would retire at the end of the season.

Personal life
He lived in Wales as a child but later moved to Devon. He runs his own cycling clothing company called Le Col, which became a co-title sponsor of the  UCI Continental team for 2019. Le Col has provided the cycling kit for UCI WorldTeam  since the start of the 2022 season.

Major results

1998
 1st  Road race, National Junior Road Championships
 2nd Road race, Welsh Road Championships
2001
 6th La Côte Picarde
2002
 3rd Grand Prix de la Ville de Lillers
2003
 1st Overall Mavic Cup Series
2nd Course La Ville
 1st Stage 1 Circuit des Mines
 9th Bordeaux–Saintes
2004
 1st Overall Mavic Cup Series
5th GP Rougy
 1st GP Carelleur
 2nd Tour De France Compte
 3rd Grand Prix des Marbriers
 4th Overall Tour Nord-Isère
 10th Overall Tour de Serbie
 10th Paris–Troyes
2005
 1st Overall Surrey 5-day
 2nd East Yorkshire Classic
 2nd Havant GP
 3rd Road race, National Road Championships
 3rd Round of the Surrey League, 'Eastway Classic'/'Taunton Criterium'
 4th Overall Rás Tailteann
 6th Paris–Troyes
 6th La Roue Tourangelle
 8th Lincoln Grand Prix
 9th Overall Tour of Britain
 10th Hel van het Mergelland
2009
 3rd East Midlands Classic
2010
 3rd East Midlands Classic
 4th Overall Tour of Libya
 5th Dumfries Bike Fest Grand Prix
 10th GP Al Fatah
2011
 4th Hillingdon GP
2012
 5th Rutland–Melton CiCLE Classic
 7th Grand Prix de la Ville de Lillers
2013
 Tour Series
1st Kirkcaldy & Stoke-on-Trent
 1st UCS Ipswich and Coastal GP
 3rd Perfs Pedal Race
 4th Rutland–Melton CiCLE Classic
 9th Wales Open Criterium
2014
 1st  Overall British Cycling Elite Road Series
4th Ipswich and Coastal Grand Prix
5th Circuit of the Fens
7th Wales Open Criterium
7th Leicester Castle Classic
 1st Overall British Cycling Spring Cup
1st Lincoln Grand Prix
3rd Overall Tour of the Reservoir
5th Cycle Wiltshire Grand Prix
 1st Evesham Vale Road Race
 5th Jersey International Road Race
2015
 1st Perfs Pedal Race
 2nd Grand Prix of Wales
 2nd Cycle Wiltshire Grand Prix
 2nd Severn Bridge Road Race
 3rd Beaumont Trophy
 4th Overall Totnes-Vire Stage Race
 10th Chorley Grand Prix
2016
 7th Vuelta a La Rioja

References

External links

1980 births
Living people
Commonwealth Games competitors for Wales
Cyclists at the 2002 Commonwealth Games
Cyclists at the 2006 Commonwealth Games
Welsh male cyclists
Sportspeople from Carmarthen